Exeter High School is a government co-educational comprehensive junior secondary school located in , northern Tasmania, Australia. Established in 1985, the school caters for approximately 300 students from Years 7 to 10. The school is administered by the Tasmanian Department of Education.

In 2019 student enrolments were 284. The school principal is Benjamin Frerk.

History
The school was established in 1909 as the Exeter State School. Following a merger with other state schools, in 1940 it became the West Tamar Area School. There followed further name changes, to Exeter Area School in 1954 and then to Exeter District High School in 1973. On 5 November 1985 the school was split into primary and secondary schools with the secondary streams forming Exeter High School. The high school was opened in 1985 by the then premier, Robin Gray.

See also 
 List of schools in Tasmania
 Education in Tasmania

References

External links
 Exeter High School website

Public high schools in Tasmania
Educational institutions established in 1909
1909 establishments in Australia